FinTech Awards are several award ceremonies, most of them unrelated, which are held all over the world to recognize excellence in financial technology as assessed by either a public vote or panels of judges. There are typically many categories, winners and prizes. Hundreds of companies, mostly startups, participate as candidates.

As of 2016, major fintech awards ceremonies are held in India, Australia, Canada, Italy, Luxembourg, the Netherlands, South Africa, Switzerland, United Kingdom, and United States. Two ceremonies are not national but continental: the African FinTech Awards and Conference, and the European Fintech Awards.

Awards by country and continent

Africa

The first African FinTech Awards and Conference will be held within the Finance Indaba Africa conference and expo in Johannesburg in October 2016. It will gather Africa's leading FinTech entrepreneurs, bankers, investors and advisors.

Australia

The 1st Annual Australian FinTech Awards will be held on 23 June 2016. The awards will be given in thirteen categories. The project, product, research paper, campaign, or activity that is entered must have been created, developed or released in the 18 months before the awards to be a valid entry.

Founded by Glen Frost, the founder of  FinTech Summit, and sponsored by Ashurst, the awards celebrate the achievements of the people and businesses comprising the fintech sector.

Canada

The Canadian FinTech Awards were created in 2015 by the Digital Finance Institute, a prominent global think tank for financial technology, created in 2013, that has helped build the Canadian FinTech ecosystem. The Canadian FinTech & AI Awards were first held in Toronto to celebrate Canadian innovation.

Dubai
The FiNext Awards were created in 2018 by the InternetShine Corporation, a prominent financial technology development company, that has helped build the US FinTech ecosystem. The FiNext Conference Awards were first held in Las Vegas to celebrate American innovation in Finance. It has been covered by many prominent newspapers like Entrepreneur

Finland
Helsinki Fintech Farm is the FinTech hub of Helsinki  operated by HUB13. They are organizing the award "Best Finnish Fintech company of the year" and looking for the most innovative and scalable Finnish FinTech  company. Enfuce Financial Services was the winner in 2018.

Europe

The European FinTech Awards is an organization that aims to disrupt traditional financial intuitions by providing a platform for fintech entrepreneurs to collaborate with one another. Like the Dutch and African awards, the European awards are the result of an initiative of Alex van Groningen BV, a Dutch financial publisher.

The awards start with the European FinTech 100, a selection of innovative companies with ground-breaking ideas and technologies. The wide batch is chosen by the vote of more than 55,000 fintech enthusiasts from all over Europe (as of 2016). Then a panel of fintech experts reduces the selection to one hundred companies. The one hundred, in turn, are the pool from which the finalists are chosen. The finalists have the opportunity to pitch during the conference.

The first European FinTech Awards & Conference was held in Amsterdam on 14 April 2016. 413 companies from 34 European countries were nominated. 30% of all nominees were from United Kingdom.

Behaviosec was the winner of the award for the Best European FinTech Company 2016. Winners in the 9 sub-categories were: Monese (Challenger Banks), Funding Circle (Alternative Finance), Ebury (Payments), Wikifolio (PFM), Everledger (Blockchain), Kreditech (Financial Inclusion), Knip (InsurTech), Backbase (Innovative Banking Software), and Behaviosec (Risk, Intelligence & Security).

India
FinTech Awards is an event organized by the India FinTech Forum along with several startup accelerators. The winners are decided by a panel of industry stalwarts. The event focuses on actual working product demonstrations to encourage innovation and entrepreneurship.

Italy

The Italian Fintech Awards originated from the Grand Prix for Italian startups, held in 2014. The Grand Prix and the Fintech Awards, both organized by CheBanca!, have been geared towards the best Italian fintech startups. The 2016 edition had a call for submission until 31 March. 12 finalists were chosen among the candidates.

The winner is awarded 25,000 euros, personalized workshops with startup coaches, and a visit to a startup bootcamp in London.

Luxembourg

The first Fintech Lion Awards, in Luxembourg, were held on 21 June 2016. Among the candidates, 15 start-ups from Luxembourg were chosen to pitch their projects at the semi-finals in May. Ten of them were chosen for the finals, which will be held under the patronage of Prime Minister Xavier Bettel.

Netherlands

The first Dutch Fintech Awards took place at the headquarters of host ABN AMRO in Amsterdam in 2015. A 40-member jury gave awards in seven categories. The awards were attended by some 400 national and international fintech investors, companies, experts and executives.

In 2015, Adyen was the overall winner, receiving the award for a lasting breakthrough in the current payment industry. The winners in particular categories were: AcceptEmail (Payments), Five degrees (Banking IT), Bux (Personal Finance), Bitonic (Bitcoin), Sparkholder (Intelligence & Analytics), Symbid (SME).

Switzerland

The call for submissions for the first Swiss Fintech Award was published in October 2015. Any company founded by a Swiss citizen or headquartered in Switzerland could participate. A jury of 16 experts chose the top ten enterprises that would be trained in boot camps. The second round was a speed dating event with the jury and award sponsors in early February 2016. The three finalists pitched their ideas at the financial and economic forum "Fintech 2016" on 31 March 2016. The winner won a cash prize and a stay at the Accenture Fintech Innovation Lab in London.

United Kingdom

The UK Fintech Awards ceremony was held in London on 13 April 2016. Sponsored by Bobsguide, the awards recognised achievements across the global financial technology industry. There are also the annual AltFi Awards, which are put together each year by the FinTech publication AltFi News.

United States

In the United States, there are two major award ceremonies.

The Benzinga Fintech Awards (BZ Awards) take place in New York. Their purpose is to "showcase the companies with the most impressive technology, who are paving the future in financial services and capital markets." There are 18 awards. In 2016, more than 25,000 people voted for their favorites among 223 companies from around the globe.

The Efma Fintech Awards highlight the best in class fintech solutions in several categories, with a panel of experts voting on the best solutions. In 2016, the winners were announced at Efma's Distribution Summit on 14 April 2016.

The FiNext Awards were created in 2018 by the InternetShine Corporation, a prominent financial technology development company, that has helped build the US FinTech ecosystem. The FiNext Conference Awards were first held in Las Vegas to celebrate American innovation in Finance.

See also

 List of business and industry awards

References 

Business and industry awards
Financial technology